The following is the electoral history of David Clarke. He served four terms as the 64th Sheriff of Milwaukee County, Wisconsin, before resigning on August 31, 2017.

Milwaukee County sheriff elections

2002

2006

2010

2014

Mayor of Milwaukee election

References 

Clarke, David